The Etpison Museum is a museum in Koror City, in Koror, Palau. It documents history of the country and some of the artifacts.

History
The land for the construction of the museum was donated by former President Ngiratkel Etpison. The museum was opened in August 1999. In 2014, it underwent renovation and more displays were added.

Architecture
The 3-story building museum was designed by Shallum and Mandy Etpison. The museum features a gift shop.

Exhibitions
The museum exhibits various artifacts on the history of the nation, money, archaeological sites, clothes etc.

See also
 List of museums in Palau

References

External links

 

1999 establishments in Palau
Buildings and structures in Koror
Museums in Palau
Museums established in 1999